Pachena Point Lighthouse is located on Vancouver Island,  south of Bamfield, British Columbia, in Pacific Rim National Park. The octagonal wooden tower is maintained by the Canadian Coast Guard who employ lighthouse keepers at the station.

Keepers
 John S. Richardson 1907 – 1908
 William Robinson Pillar 1908 – 1913
 Richard Clark 1913 – 1919
 G. Allan Couldrey 1919 - 1923
 Art Gorden 1923 – 1924
 James W. Davis 1925 – 1930
 Guy Clear 1930 – 1931
 John Alfred Hunting 1924, 1931 - 1958
 Gerald Wellard 1957 – 1959
 William Milne 1969
 F. Bergthorson 1969 – 1973
 Robert W. Noble 1973 – 1976
 Tom E. Carr 1977 – 1983
 Edward J. Ashe 1983 – 1985
 Ian Crocker 1985 – 1991, 1996 – 1998
 Iain Colquohuon 1988 – 1991
 Peter Redhead 1991 – 1992, 1998 – 2004
 Calvin Martin 2005 – Present 2021<ref>[Calvin Martin Lighthouse Keeper Pachena Point Lightstation]

See also
 List of lighthouses in British Columbia
 List of lighthouses in Canada

References

External links
 Aids to Navigation Canadian Coast Guard
 Fogwhistle Website
 Lighthouse Depot Database, Pachena Point

 

Lighthouses completed in 1908
Lighthouses in British Columbia
Octagonal buildings in Canada
Heritage sites in British Columbia
1908 establishments in British Columbia
Lighthouses on the Canadian Register of Historic Places